Eaglesvale Senior School is a Christian, co-educational independent, boarding and day school situated on an estate approximately  in Harare, Zimbabwe. It is 12 km south west of the Harare Central Business District. It shares the same estate with Eaglesvale Preparatory School which is the primary school.

There are over 500 pupils in the senior school. Students, alumni and staff of Eaglesvale call their school 'Vale'.

Eaglesvale Senior School and Preparatory School are members of the Association of Trust Schools (ATS) and the Headmasters are members of the Conference of Heads of Independent Schools in Zimbabwe (CHISZ). The schools participate in the festivals held by the National Institute of Allied Arts.

History

Eaglesvale’s first home was in Bulawayo where it opened as the Bulawayo Orphanage on 30 January 1911, an establishment of the Dutch Reformed Church by Reverends A.J. Botha and J.N. Geldenhuys. In 1914 the Dutch Reformed Church then moved the school (orphanage) to Daisyfield Farm in Somabhula near Gweru with the intention of establishing a farm to produce food for the orphans. The school was renamed Daisyfiled. In 1948, the Dutch Reformed Church as the responsible Authority moved the school to the present site. This was a farm  from Salisbury (now Harare). The school was built close to the railway line for easy transport. The school was renamed Bothashof School in honour of H Botha, son of Rev. A.J. Botha, also a Reverend of the Dutch Reformed Church. As the city expanded, most of the farm was sold giving in to industrial development in the early 1970s. In 1978 the school struggled to get students resulting in the Dutch Reformed Church, Central Africa, closing the school and selling the land to National Railways of Zimbabwe (then Rhodesia Railways).

In 1982, the school reopened with one black student and the rest white. Due to the new Zimbabwean Government’s policy of education for all, the school enrolment increased to 400 in the Junior School and eight hundred in the Senior School. The principal was Mr Stokes.

In 1985, Bothashof School was renamed Eaglesvale. In 1988, the school celebrated 40 years in Willowvale. J Bousfield joined the school in 1989 as the new headmaster. In 2002 Kenneth McKean took over as headmaster. Due to economic and other hardships, the school enrolment dropped to below 600. New subjects such as Design and Technology, Thinking Skills etc. were introduced to the curriculum and the enrolment stabilised. McKean left at the end of August 2008 and Mr Tirivavi took over as headmaster of the school.

On 11 June 2010, the Dutch Reformed Church, Central Africa, surrendered the Daisyfield Trust which inter alia had the responsibility of Eaglesvale School to the Reformed Church in Zimbabwe under the leadership of Rev Dr Chomutiri as moderator. The Daisyfield Trust was renamed the RCZ Daisyfield Trust. All legal formalities were completed. On 13 February 2014, the Dutch Reformed Church Central Africa represented by Rev G A Brytenbach publicly handed over Eaglesvale School to the Reformed Church in Zimbabwe represented by the Moderator Rev Dr Rangarirai Rutoro. The event was attended by Local Government minister Ignatius Chombo, Education minister Lazarus Dokora and Finance minister Patrick Chinamasa.

In 2015, Naison Tirivavi left the school with Mr. R. Ndawona, then deputy headmaster, assuming the role as acting headmaster of Eaglesvale Senior School. Mr. Dennis Anderson was appointed Headmaster of the Senior School from 1 May 2016.

The school badge and motto
The school badge consists of a shield divided into two fields horizontally and the motto of the institution underneath. The shield has a bible on a green background in the top division and an ox wagon on a maroon background in the bottom division of the shield. The badge symbolised the history of the people that founded the school who tried to live according to the Word of God. Diens is the school motto which means "Service" in the Afrikaans language.

Notable alumni

 Andy Blignaut, Zimbabwe cricketer
 Gary Brent, Zimbabwe cricketer
 Mark Burmester, former Zimbabwean cricketer
 Alistair Campbell (cricketer), former Zimbabwe cricket captain
 Friday Kasteni, Zimbabwe cricketer 
 Dougie Marillier, Zimbabwe cricketer, inventor of the Marillier shot (batting technique)
 Darlington Matambanadzo, Zimbabwe cricketer
 Everton Matambanadzo, Zimbabwe cricketer
 Tinashe Mutanga, Zimbabwe track athlete
 Tatenda Tsumba, Zimbabwe track athlete
 Rugare Magarira, Zimbabwe cricketer
 Solomon Mire, Zimbabwe cricketer

Photo gallery

See also

 List of schools in Zimbabwe
 List of boarding schools

Notes

References

External links
Eaglesvale School website
Eaglesvale Senior School Profile on the ATS website

Facebook group for alumni
Eaglesvale Google Maps
Facebook group archive
Eaglesvale Wetpaint website

Schools in Harare
Private schools in Zimbabwe
Co-educational schools in Zimbabwe
Cambridge schools in Zimbabwe
Day schools in Zimbabwe
Boarding schools in Zimbabwe
High schools in Zimbabwe
Educational institutions established in 1911
Member schools of the Association of Trust Schools
1911 establishments in the British Empire